Aurit Zamir (born July 26, 1972) is an Israeli filmmaker, active as a producer, director and screenwriter as well as the director of the Sam Spiegel Film and Television School International Film Lab.

Zamir produced Ruthy Pribar’s Asia, which was Israel’s entry into the 2020 Academy Awards for best foreign film, and won 9 Israeli Academy Awards, including Best Film.

Biography 
Born and raised in Tel Aviv, Aurit spent a number of years in the US with her family. Upon returning to Israel she completed high school in Tel Aviv with a concentration on film, photography and literature.

Aurit served in the IDF air force and moved to New York City after her army service. She studied creative writing at NY and continued her studies when she returned to Israel, first at Camera Obscura and later at Tel Aviv University where she studied English literature.

She went on to study film at the Jerusalem Sam Spiegel Film and Television School and graduated with honors in 2001. During her studies she also won the Department of Education Prize as well as the Mayoral First Prize.

Her graduation film 800 Calories won Israeli and international prizes and was broadcast on Israeli television.

Career 
After her graduation, Aurit began working in the Israeli film industry. She served as first assistant director on a number of feature films including Miss Entebbe, Broken Wings, Ricky, Ricky, Noodle, The Long Journey and In Treatment.

Her production experience began in workshops such as Producers Network in Cannes and Rotterdam as well as in EAVE.

In 2008 she established Gum Films along with her partner Yoav Roeh. Together they have produced the feature films Asia, The Testament, Manpower, Off White Lies, and the documentaries As Themselves, The Lab, Night Shift, Long Distance.

She was a producing partner on The Accursed and produced the documentary series One Last Bedtime Story and the dramatic series The Missing File.

Films she produced have screened at leading international film festivals including Berlin and Venice.

Her 2016 short Babysitter, which she wrote and directed, won first place at the Haifa International Film Festival and the directing prize at Flickers Film Festival.

Her Hebrew prose has been published in literary magazines such as Granta (2018) and Petel (2019).

A longtime teacher and mentor at her alma mater, Zamir headed since 2018 till 2021 the Entrepreneurial Producing Department at the Jerusalem Sam Spiegel Film and Television School.

She has served as a lector for the Israel Film Fund, the Jerusalem International Film Lab, and the Haifa International Film Festival as well as jury member at DocAviv.

In January 2020 she was appointed the director of the Sam Spiegel International Film Lab

Filmography



External links 

 Jerusalem Sam Spiegel Film Lab looks back on 10 triumphant years, The Jerusalem post, Hannah Brown,  October 14, 2021
 Aurit Zamir appointed new director of Israel’s Sam Spiegel International Film Lab, ScreenDaily, Melanie Goodfellow, Febtuary 12, 2020
 ‘Asia’ Review: Israel’s Oscar Entry Is a Delicate Mother-Daughter Drama That Doesn’t Try Too Hard for Tears, Variety, Guy Lodge, December 29, 2020

References 

Living people
Israeli film directors
1972 births
Israeli women film directors
Film people from Tel Aviv
Tel Aviv University alumni